Roper is a town in Washington County, North Carolina, United States. The population was 611 at the 2010 census. It was known as Lee's Mill (named for Thomas Lee) until 1890, when the John L. Roper Lumber Company was established in the town and its name changed to Roper.

Geography
Roper is located at  (35.875877, -76.614905).

Demographics

As of the census of 2000, there were 613 people, 238 households, and 165 families residing in the town. The population density was 706.9 people per square mile (272.0/km). There were 268 housing units at an average density of 309.0 per square mile (118.9/km). The racial makeup of the town was 20.55% White, 75.20% African American, 3.43% from other races, and 0.82% from two or more races. Hispanic or Latino of any race were 5.06% of the population.

There were 238 households, of which 31.9% had children under the age of 18 living with them, 37.0% were married couples living together, 28.2% had a female householder with no husband present, and 30.3% were not families. About 29.4% of all households were made up of individuals, and 17.6% had someone living alone who was 65 years of age or older. The average household size was 2.58 and the average family size was 3.16.

In the town, the population was distributed as 29.2% under the age of 18, 7.8% from 18 to 24, 23.2% from 25 to 44, 23.3% from 45 to 64, and 16.5% who were 65 years of age or older. The median age was 38 years. For every 100 females, there were 75.6 males. For every 100 females age 18 and over, there were 66.9 males.

The median income for a household in the town was $20,694, and the median income for a family was $25,938. Males had a median income of $19,821 versus $18,846 for females. The per capita income for the town was $14,736. About 26.1% of families and 27.1% of the population were below the poverty line, including 31.5% of those under age 18 and 29.8% of those age 65 or over.

References

 Modlin, Betsy Burgess Lucas et al. "My Home is Washington County, North Carolina" 

Towns in Washington County, North Carolina
Towns in North Carolina